Villeneuve-le-Roi is a commune in the southern suburbs of Paris, France. The early 19th-century French orientalist Jean-Baptiste Rousseau (1780–1831) was born in Villeneuve-le-Roi on the boat that arrived from Auxerre.

Orly Airport is partially located in the commune.

Population

Transport
Villeneuve-le-Roi is served by Villeneuve-le-Roi station on Paris RER line C.

Education
Communal schools include:
 Preschools (écoles maternelles): Cites-Unies, Paul-Painlevé, Paul-Bert, Paul-Eluard, Pauline-Kergomard, and Annie-Fratellini
 Elementary schools: Paul-Bert, Paul-Painlevé, Jules-Ferry, and Jean-Moulin

There are two junior high schools:
 Collège Jean Macé Villeneuve Le Roi
 Collège Jules Ferry

There is one senior high school: Lycée Georges Brassens.

The commune has a public library, Bibliothèque municipale Anatole-France.

Twin towns – sister cities

Villeneuve-le-Roi is twinned with:
 Arpino, Italy
 São Pedro do Sul, Portugal
 Stourport-on-Severn, England, United Kingdom
 Vratsa, Bulgaria

See also
Communes of the Val-de-Marne department

References

External links
Official website 

Communes of Val-de-Marne